Love Song of the Waterfall is a studio album by Slim Whitman, released in 1965 on Imperial Records.

Track listing 
The album was issued in the United States and Canada by Imperial Records as a 12-inch long-playing record, catalog numbers LP-9277 (mono) and LP-12277 (stereo).

Charts

References 

1965 albums
Slim Whitman albums
Imperial Records albums